The 1989 Santam Bank Trophy was the third tier of domestic South African rugby, below the two Currie Cup divisions.

Teams

Changes between 1989 and 1990 seasons
 Divisions A and B merged into one nine-team division.

Changes between 1990 and 1991 seasons
 The 1990 season was the last edition of the Santam Bank Trophy. Instead, these teams were included in a Currie Cup Rural Division, which had a four-team Division C and a five-team Division D.
  were promoted  to the 1991 Currie Cup Central B.
  were relegated from 1990 Currie Cup Division B to the 1991 Currie Cup Rural C.
 ,  and  moved to the 1991 Currie Cup Rural C.

Competition

Regular season and title play-offs
There were nine participating teams in the Santam Bank Trophy Division A. Teams played each other once over the course of the season, either at home or away. Teams received two points for a win and one points for a draw. The top two teams in the division qualified for the title play-off finals. The team that finished first would play at home against the team that finished second.

Log
The final standings after the pool stage of the Santam Bank Trophy was as follows:

Fixtures and results

Round one

Round two

Round three

Round four

Round five

Round six

Round seven

Round eight

Round nine

Final

See also
 1990 Currie Cup Division A
 1990 Currie Cup Division B
 1990 Lion Cup

References

1990
1990 Currie Cup